Chanal is a town and one of the 119 Municipalities of Chiapas, in southern Mexico. It covers an area of 295.6 km².

As of 2010, the municipality had a total population of 10,817, up from 7,568 as of 2005. 

As of 2010, the town of Chanal had a population of 7,008. Other than the town of Chanal, the municipality had 19 localities, none of which had a population over 1,000.

References

Municipalities of Chiapas